Heishan (黑山; literally black mountain) may refer to:
Heishan bandits (黑山賊), an offshoot of the Yellow Turban Rebellion during the Eastern Han Dynasty

Locations in China
Heishan County, Jinzhou, Liaoning

Towns
Heishan, Heilongjiang, in Bayan County
Heishan Town, Liaoning, in Heishan County

Townships
Heishan Township, Shaanxi, in Shangzhou District, Shangluo
Heishan Township, Shandong, in Changdao County

See also
 黑山 (disambiguation)
 Black Mountain (disambiguation)